Yang Dongi (born December 7, 1984), often anglicised  to Dongi Yang or Dong-Yi Yang, is a South Korean mixed martial artist who currently competes in the Middleweight division of ONE Championship. A professional MMA competitor since 2007, Yang has formerly competed for DEEP and World Victory Road.

Mixed martial arts career

Early career

Yang began his professional career in South Korea in a tournament. Yang won three successive fights (the first via triangle choke submission and the next two via TKO to punches).

Yang followed this up with a win at the Super Sambo Festival, again via TKO (punches).

Rise to prominence in Asia
Yang then joined the larger DEEP promotion. Here, Yang won two successive bouts, both via TKO (punches).

Yang then joined Sengoku and competed in their Sengoku Fourth Battle event. His opponent was Polish judoka Pawel Nastula. After 2:15 of the second round, Yang was victorious via TKO (exhaustion) The fight was slightly controversial due to Yang landing a knee in the clinch that earned him a yellow card. After this, Nastula was noticeably sluggish and would later complain of a groin problem. For "inexplicable reasons" the referee stopped the fight and gave a TKO verdict.

Yang then defeated two opponents; one in Japan and one in the Northern Mariana Islands. As was becoming a pattern in his career, Yang won both fights via TKO (punches).

Ultimate Fighting Championship
In June 2010, Yang signed with the UFC, joining Chan Sung Jung as the members of Korean Top Team competing in Zuffa organizations.

Yang's UFC debut was at UFC 121 against The Ultimate Fighter competitor Chris Camozzi. Yang began the fight with a successful takedown, followed by ground-and-pound. After standing up, Camozzi was able to keep Yang at bay with kicks, before engaging in the clinch. However, Yang's thick neck and shoulders prevented effective attacks. Later, Camozzi was able to effectively time the advance of Yang. In the third, Yang began to swing wildly, to no avail. Camozzi was declared the winner via split decision (29–28, 28–29, 29–28).

Yang next fight was against Rob Kimmons on March 3, 2011 at UFC Live: Sanchez vs. Kampmann. Yang won the fight by TKO near the end of the second round, giving him his first UFC win.

Yang faced Court McGee on September 17, 2011 in the co-main event at UFC Fight Night 25. The match was a pure back and forth kickboxing match. Yang was able to have some success and connected with some punches that wobbled McGee, in the end it was not enough to get the victory.

Yang faced Brad Tavares on May 15, 2012 at UFC on Fuel TV: Korean Zombie vs. Poirier. Yang was defeated by Tavares via unanimous decision and was subsequently released from the promotion.

Post-UFC
On June 29, 2013 Yang defeated ROAD FC veteran Jae Young Kim by TKO in the second round at Top FC 1 in South Korea. Yang followed that up with an impressive first round TKO of fellow UFC veteran Dennis Hallman at Top FC 6 on April 5, 2015.

Return to UFC
In late August, it was confirmed that Yang had re-signed with the UFC and will continue competing in the promotion's Middleweight division. He faced Jake Collier at UFC Fight Night 79 on November 28, 2015.  He won the fight via TKO in the second round.

Yang was expected to face promotional newcomer Ryan Janes on October 15, 2016 at UFC Fight Night 97. However, the promotion announced on October 6 that they had cancelled the event entirely.

Mixed martial arts record

|-
|Loss
|align=center|14–4
|Cally Gibrainn de Oliveira
|TKO (punches)
|Double G FC 2
|
|align=center|1
|align=center|4:24
|Seoul, South Korea
|
|-
|Win
|align=center|14–3
|Paul Cheng
|TKO (punches)
|Double G FC 1
|
|align=center|1
|align=center|2:06
|Seoul, South Korea
|
|-
|Win
|align=center|13–3
|Jake Collier
|TKO (punches)
|UFC Fight Night: Henderson vs. Masvidal
|
|align=center|2
|align=center|1:50
|Seoul, South Korea
|
|-
| Win
| align=center| 12–3
| Dennis Hallman
| TKO (punches)
| Top FC 6: Unbreakable Dream
| 
| align=center| 1
| align=center| 3:25
| Seoul, South Korea
| 
|-
| Win
| align=center| 11–3
| Jae Young Kim
| TKO (body kicks and punches)
| Top FC 1: Original
| 
| align=center| 2
| align=center| 4:06
| Seoul, South Korea
| 
|-
| Loss
| align=center| 10–3
| Brad Tavares
| Decision (unanimous)
| UFC on Fuel TV: Korean Zombie vs. Poirier
| 
| align=center| 3
| align=center| 5:00
| Fairfax, Virginia, United States
| 
|-
| Loss
| align=center| 10–2
| Court McGee
| Decision (unanimous)
| UFC Fight Night: Shields vs. Ellenberger
| 
| align=center| 3
| align=center| 5:00
| New Orleans, Louisiana, United States
| 
|-
| Win
| align=center| 10–1
| Rob Kimmons
| TKO (punches)
| UFC Live: Sanchez vs. Kampmann
| 
| align=center| 2
| align=center| 4:47
| Louisville, Kentucky, United States
| 
|-
| Loss
| align=center| 9–1
| Chris Camozzi
| Decision (split)
| UFC 121
| 
| align=center| 3
| align=center| 5:00
| Anaheim, California, United States
| 
|-
| Win
| align=center| 9–0
| Bill Saures
| TKO (punches)
| Trench Warz 12: Battle Brawl
| 
| align=center| 1
| align=center| 1:07
| Saipan, Northern Mariana Islands
| Middleweight debut.
|-
| Win
| align=center| 8–0
| Ryuta Noji
| TKO (punches)
| Heat 8
| 
| align=center| 2
| align=center| 3:17
| Tokyo, Japan
| 
|-
| Win
| align=center| 7–0
| Pawel Nastula
| TKO (exhaustion)
| World Victory Road Presents: Sengoku 4
| 
| align=center| 2
| align=center| 2:15
| Saitama, Japan
| 
|-
| Win
| align=center| 6–0
| Keigo Takamori
| TKO (punches)
| Deep: 31 Impact
| 
| align=center| 1
| align=center| 1:57
| Tokyo, Japan
| 
|-
| Win
| align=center| 5–0
| Junpei Hamada
| TKO (punches)
| Deep: CMA Festival 2
| 
| align=center| 1
| align=center| 3:56
| Tokyo, Japan
| 
|-
| Win
| align=center| 4–0
| Chang Seob Lee
| TKO (punches)
| Super Sambo Festival
| 
| align=center| 3
| align=center| 4:56
| Gyeongju, South Korea
| 
|-
| Win
| align=center| 3–0
| Yun Seob Kwak
| TKO (punches)
| WXF: North Jeolla MMA Championships
| 
| align=center| 2
| align=center| 2:35
| North Jeolla, South Korea
| 
|-
| Win
| align=center| 2–0
| Dool Hee Lee
| TKO (punches)
| WXF: North Jeolla MMA Championships
| 
| align=center| 1
| align=center| 1:36
| North Jeolla, South Korea
| 
|-
| Win
| align=center| 1–0
| Hyung Kyo Lee
| Submission (triangle choke)
| WXF: North Jeolla MMA Championships
| 
| align=center| 1
| align=center| 1:40
| North Jeolla, South Korea
|

References

External links

Official UFC Profile

1984 births
Living people
People from Seoul
Sportspeople from Seoul
South Korean male mixed martial artists
Middleweight mixed martial artists
Light heavyweight mixed martial artists
Heavyweight mixed martial artists
South Korean male taekwondo practitioners
South Korean male judoka
South Korean sambo practitioners
Ultimate Fighting Championship male fighters
Mixed martial artists utilizing judo
Mixed martial artists utilizing taekwondo
Mixed martial artists utilizing sambo
Mixed martial artists utilizing Yongmudo